Borislav "Bora" Džaković (24 October 1947 – 28 June 2019) was a Serbian-Bosnian professional basketball coach and player.

Coaching career 
The greatest success of Džaković was the double crown with Partizan in the 1994–95 season. Džaković managed with Sloboda Tuzla to get into the Yugoslav First Basketball League for the 1986–87 season and the 1991–92 season. He also led the Šibenka, Borac Banja Luka and Crvena zvezda.

The only foreign engagement was in Cyprus Division A, where he coached ENAD Ayiou Dometiou, based in Nicosia.

National team coaching career 
Džaković was a head coach of the Yugoslavia national team that won a silver medal at the 1986 Balkan Championship.

Career achievements 
 YUBA League champion: 1  (with Partizan: 1994–95)
 FR Yugoslav Cup winner: 1  (with Partizan: 1994–95)

Personal life 
Džaković died on 28 June 2019 in Belgrade, Serbia, after a battle with a disease.

See also 
 List of KK Crvena zvezda head coaches
 List of KK Partizan head coaches

References

1947 births
2019 deaths
Basketball players from Mostar
Bosnia and Herzegovina expatriate basketball people in Serbia
Bosnia and Herzegovina basketball coaches
Bosnia and Herzegovina men's basketball players
KK Borac Banja Luka coaches
OKK Borac coaches
KK Crvena zvezda assistant coaches
KK Crvena Zvezda executives
KK Crvena zvezda head coaches
KK Lokomotiva Mostar players
KK Partizan coaches
KK Sloboda Tuzla coaches
KK Vojvodina coaches
KK Šibenik coaches
Serbs of Bosnia and Herzegovina
Serbian basketball executives and administrators
Serbian expatriate basketball people in Croatia 
Serbian expatriate basketball people in Cyprus
Serbian expatriate basketball people in Bosnia and Herzegovina
Serbian men's basketball coaches
Serbian men's basketball players
Yugoslav basketball coaches
Yugoslav men's basketball players